In July 2010, a mass grave was discovered next to the Peter and Paul Fortress in St. Petersburg, containing the corpses of 80 military officers executed during the Red Terror of 1918–1921. By 2013 a total of 156 bodies had been found in the same location. At about the same time a mass grave from the Stalin period was discovered at the other end of the country in Vladivostok.

These and later mass graves in the Soviet Union were used to conceal the large numbers of Soviet citizens and foreigners executed by the Bolshevik regime under Vladimir Lenin and Joseph Stalin. Indiscriminate mass killings began in January 1918 during the Russian Civil War (1918–1922) as the Bolsheviks launched their Red Terror. After the upheavals of the First Five-Year Plan (1928–1932) the killings reached a peak in the  Great Terror of 1937–1938. At all times they were directed and carried out by the Soviet secret police under its changing titles: the Cheka during the Civil War, the OGPU during forced collectivisation of agriculture, and the NKVD during the Great Terror.

Mass murder, 1937–1938
In the final years of the USSR and after its demise in 1991, killing fields and burial sites were uncovered and memorialised across the countries of the former Soviet Union. Some dated back to the Civil War or to the intervening years when the secret police in all major Soviet cities regularly used unmarked graves in existing cemeteries to dispose of those they executed or killed during interrogation. Most came into existence during the Great Terror.

Between 5 August 1937 and 17 November 1938 the scale of killing reached its apogee. In a series of 12 "operations" the NKVD executed at least 680,000 men and women. That is the documented total: the real figure is almost certainly higher. In preparation for mass murder on such a scale the NKVD People's Commissar Yezhov instructed his subordinates throughout the Soviet Union to identify areas not far from the major urban centres where thousands of bodies could be quickly concealed. This was described by the late Arseny Roginsky

“In July that year NKVD departments across the USSR had already begun to set aside special ‘zones’, areas for the mass burial of those they shot. For locals these usually became known, euphemistically, as army firing ranges. This was how the zones that we know today came into being: the Levashovo Wasteland near Leningrad, Kuropaty near Minsk, the Golden Hill near Chelyabinsk, Bykovnya on the outskirts of Kiev, and many others.”

The widespread description of these sites as "firing ranges" has led to a confusion between killing fields where the victims were both shot and buried, e.g. Sandarmokh, and the many other sites where those being buried and concealed had already been executed elsewhere.

Ukraine
 Bykivnia Graves near Kiev contain an estimated 30,000.
 There are other mass graves in Uman, Bila Tserkva, Cherkasy and Zhytomyr.
 9,432 corpses were exhumed following the Vinnytsia massacre.
 As in Russia and elsewhere, these sites keep appearing, e.g. a mass grave found in 2002 under the floor of a Ukrainian monastery.

Belarus
 Kurapaty – At least 50,000 are thought to have been shot at this site near Minsk, with considerably higher estimates in the Soviet press.

Russian Federation

Northwest Russia
 Krasny Bor Forest, Karelia
 Levashovo Memorial Cemetery in St Petersburg: 19,520 are thought to lie buried there.
 Toksovo, near Saint Petersburg was discovered in 2002. It, perhaps, contains up to 30,000 bodies.
 Sandarmokh (Karelia), was discovered in July 1997. At least 6,067 victims lie there, half of all those shot in Karelia during the Great Terror.
In or near Moscow
 The Butovo firing range. The names of 20,702 victims are etched on the granite walls of the symbolic execution trenches in the Garden of Remembrance (opened September 2017).
 Donskoye Cemetery, the location of a secret crematorium and three secret mass graves, each consisting of tens of thousands of sets of ashes.
 Kommunarka. At its October 2018 opening 6,609 names were displayed on the Wall of Remembrance.
Siberia
 Kolpashevsky Yar in Kolpashevo (Tomsk Region, west Siberia). Over 1,000 bodies discovered in 1979, were then disposed of on the instructions of the local Party chief. Up to 4,000 people were shot in Kolpashevo, Tomsk Memorial estimates today.
 Pivovarikha (Irkutsk Region, east Siberia) near Irkutsk. A memorial area was established at Pivovarikha in 1989 but no accurate estimate has been made of the numbers buried there. The Memorial online database lists 10,609 who were shot throughout the Irkutsk Region during the Great Terror. The Open List database names 1,384 who were then shot in the city of Irkutsk.

1940 onwards
The Katyn massacre in Russia. With Stalin's approval, NKVD chief Lavrenty Beria issued orders to shoot 25,700 Polish "nationalists and counter-revolutionaries", Poles held captive in a number of internment camps in western Russia, on date. The executions are collectively known as the Katyn massacre but they took place in three distinct locations: Katyn (Smolensk Region), Tver in central Russia and Kharkiv in eastern Ukraine.

At Katyn (Smolensk Region) at a site used earlier for executing hundreds of Soviet citizens. Polish POWs were shot there by the NKVD in April and May 1940. 4,413 bodies were later exhumed and identified. Polish prisoners were also shot at Kharkiv in eastern Ukraine and in Tver, then known as Kalinin. Some of them were buried at Mednoe, today a commemorative site in the Tver Region, having first been shot in Tver.
 Dem'ianiv Laz near Ivano-Frankovsk in modern Ukraine. After the Soviet occupation of the territory in 1939 at least 524 men, women and children were shot by the NKVD.
 The Augustów roundup. In July 1945 at the end of World War Two about 2,000 Polish partisans and anti-communists were rounded up in northern Poland by returning Soviet forces (Red Army, NKVD and SMERSH). Some were deported and it remains unknown where the bodies of 593 of their number lie buried.

Gallery

See also
 Kommunarka shooting ground (Moscow). Mass burial of the executed.
 NKVD prisoner massacres
 Remembrance Day for the Victims of Political Repression
 Sandarmokh (Karelia). Execution & burial site.
 Stalinist repressions in Mongolia

External links
 Russia's Necropolis of Terror and the Gulag: A select directory of burial grounds and commemorative sites. 411 sites from the Civil War to the 1950s.

References

Soviet Union
Massacres in the Soviet Union
NKVD
Political repression in the Soviet Union
Soviet World War II crimes
Politicides
Mass graves in Ukraine
Mass graves in Russia